Nocten, Nokten, or Oktenai may refer to:
 Nocten people
 Nocten language

Language and nationality disambiguation pages